Dorylomorpha anderssoni is a species of fly in the family Pipunculidae

Distribution
Great Britain, Denmark, Finland, Germany, Latvia, Norway, Sweden, Netherlands.

References

Pipunculidae
Insects described in 1979
Diptera of Europe